Denmark was represented by Grethe and Jørgen Ingmann, with the song "Dansevise", at the 1963 Eurovision Song Contest, which took place on 23 March in London. "Dansevise" was chosen as the Danish entry at the Dansk Melodi Grand Prix on 24 February, and went on to win the contest for Denmark in the most controversial of circumstances, when it was alleged that the Norwegian jury had altered their votes in order to hand victory to Denmark at the expense of Switzerland.

Before Eurovision

Dansk Melodi Grand Prix 1963
The DMGP was held at the Tivoli in Copenhagen, hosted by Marianne Birkelund. Eight songs took part with the winner being chosen by a 10-member jury. Other past and future Eurovision entrants competing were Birthe Wilke (1957 & 1959), Dario Campeotto (1961), Bjørn Tidmand (1964) and Gitte Hænning (1973, for Germany).

At Eurovision

Voting controversy
On the night of the final the Ingmanns performed 8th in the running order, following Finland and preceding Yugoslavia. "Dansevise" was a very sophisticated, atmospheric song, unlike anything previously heard in Eurovision. The pre-contest betting had suggested a two-horse race between Denmark and Switzerland, and the two songs quickly separated themselves from the pack in the early rounds of voting, which was done by each national jury awarding 5-4-3-2-1 to their top 5 songs. Host Katie Boyle then contacted Norway, the fifth jury due to vote, and the Norwegian spokesman clearly and confidently announced their votes as 5 to the United Kingdom, 4 to Italy, 3 to Switzerland, 2 to Denmark and 1 to Germany. However, as the spokesman had not given the results in the required format (by firstly giving the performance number of the song), Boyle asked him to repeat the votes. This appeared to confuse him, and Boyle agreed that to avoid any delay, they would come back to the Norwegian jury after all the other countries had voted.

After the last scheduled jury in Luxembourg had given their votes, Switzerland was ahead of Denmark by 39 points to 38. Had the votes originally announced by Norway been allowed to stand, Switzerland would have won by 42 points to 40. Boyle then went back to the spokesman in Oslo who now announced 5 to the United Kingdom, 4 to Denmark, 3 to Italy, 2 to Germany and 1 to Switzerland, giving the victory to Denmark by 2 points. In response to the controversy which followed the show, the European Broadcasting Union investigated the role of the Norwegian jury and concluded that there was no evidence of wrongdoing, with the confusion arising from misunderstandings. Notwithstanding, an element of suspicion has hung over the 1963 result ever since and it remains, along with 1968, the most contentious contest outcome in Eurovision history.

"Dansevise" has a very high reputation in Eurovision circles. The song often features prominently in polls to determine the best Eurovision winners, and is cited as one of the best examples of a Eurovision winner which does not date and still holds wide appeal.

Voting

References 

1963
Countries in the Eurovision Song Contest 1963